St Abraam Coptic Orthodox Church (Coptic:  // transliteration: ti.eklyseya en.remenkimi en.orthodoxos ente fi.ethowab Abra'am) is a Coptic Orthodox parish in Woodbury, New York. It is one of over 200 Coptic Orthodox Churches in the United States.

History of the Building
St. Abraam Coptic Orthodox Church was incorporated by 20 families residing in Long Island in January 1978, only five years after the first Coptic Orthodox parishes in New York were founded in Ridgewood, Queens and Brooklyn, New York. For over a decade, these families used a Ukrainian church in Hicksville for accommodating weekly Liturgies. In September 1989, Pope Shenouda III blessed the endowned lands in preparation for building the church.

After the church was built in 1990, in a pastoral visit by Pope Shenouda, the parish was consecrated on 12 January 1992. It was the first Coptic Orthodox Church in Long Island, New York.

St. Abraam Coptic Orthodox Church serves areas in and around Long Island, particularly in Nassau County, which is just east of Queens. The closest Coptic Orthodox parish is St. Mary & St. Antonios Coptic Orthodox Church, in Ridgewood, Queens. St. Abraam Coptic Orthodox Church was served by multiple priests such as Fr. Micheal Tobia of East Brunswick NJ, Fr. Marcos Ghaly of Toledo, Ohio, as the Coptic Orthodox clergy in North America often visit or temporarily serve churches that are still developing. However, from recent years, Fr. Girgis Tadros was made a permanent priest of the church up until now. St. Abraam Coptic Orthodox Church currently has two priests, The Very Rev. Fr. Guirguis Tadros, The Very Rev. Fr. Moussa Shafik, and The Very Rev. Joseph Loka. There are currently about 600 Coptic families served by St. Abraam Coptic Orthodox Church.

The Coptic Orthodox Diocese of New York and New England was officially established in 2013 by Pope Tawadros II. Bishop David was consecrated in formal ceremonies taking place in Cairo, Egypt on November 16–17, 2013. Bishop David was formally enthroned on December 7, 2013 at St. Abraam Coptic Orthodox Church in a ceremony that brought together thousands of the Coptic faithful, clergy, and dignitaries. This church is now the seat of the bishop.

See also
Coptic Orthodox Church
Seat of the Coptic Orthodox Pope of Alexandria
Coptic architecture
Coptic Cairo
Coptic Orthodox Church in North America
Coptic Orthodox Church in Canada
Coptic Orthodox Church in the United States
List of Coptic Orthodox Churches in the United States
St. George Coptic Orthodox Church (Philadelphia)
St. George Coptic Orthodox Church (Brooklyn)
St. George & St. Shenouda Coptic Orthodox Church (Jersey City, New Jersey)
St. Mark Coptic Orthodox Church (Jersey City, New Jersey)
St. Mark Coptic Orthodox Church (Los Angeles)
St. Mary Coptic Orthodox Church (Lancaster, Pennsylvania)
St. Mary Coptic Orthodox Church (Los Angeles)

References

External links
The official website of St. Abraam Coptic Orthodox Church
The Coptic Orthodox Diocese of New York & New England
The Coptic Orthodox Archdiocese of North America
The Coptic Orthodox Diocese of Los Angeles
The Coptic Orthodox Diocese of the Southern United States
The Coptic Orthodox Diocese of Damietta
The Coptic Orthodox Diocese of Port Said

Coptic Orthodox churches in New York (state)
Christian organizations established in 1978
Oriental Orthodox congregations established in the 20th century
Churches in Nassau County, New York
1978 establishments in New York (state)